Llywarch may refer to:

Llywarch Hen (6th century), Brythonic prince and poet
Llywarch ap Hyfaidd (died c. 904), king of Dyfed
Llywarch ap Llywelyn (fl. 1173–1220), medieval Welsh poet.
Llywarch Llaety (fl. 1140–1160), Welsh court poet
Llywarch Reynolds (1843–1916), Welsh solicitor and scholar